A total of 128 qualifying places are available for table tennis at the 2015 European Games, 64 players per gender.

Qualification summary

Qualification timeline

Qualification progress

Singles
Limited to two athletes per nation.

Teams
A team consists of three players. Two of the players compete in the singles event.

References

Qualification
European Games
Qualification for the 2015 European Games